The Eloi are one of the two fictional post-human races, along with the Morlocks, in H. G. Wells'  1895 novel The Time Machine.

In H. G. Wells' The Time Machine
By the year AD 802,701, humanity has evolved into two separate species: the Eloi and the Morlocks. The Eloi live a banal life of ease on the surface of the Earth while the Morlocks live underground, tending machinery and providing food, clothing, and inventory for the Eloi. The narration suggests that the separation of species may have been the result of a widening split between different social classes. With all their needs and desires perfectly fulfilled, the Eloi have slowly become dissolute and naive: they are described as smaller than modern humans, with shoulder-length curly hair, pointed chins, large eyes, small ears, small mouths with bright red thin lips, and sub-human intelligence. They do not perform much work, except to feed, play, and mate, and are characterized by apathy; and when Weena falls into a river, none of the other Eloi help her (she is rescued instead by the Time Traveller). Periodically, the Morlocks capture individual Eloi for food; and because this typically happens on moonless nights, the Eloi are terrified of darkness.

A portion of the book written for the New Review version, later published as a separate short story, reveals that a visit by the Time Traveller to the even more distant future results in his encountering rabbit-like hopping herbivores, apparently the descendants of the Eloi. They are described as being plantigrade, with longer hind legs and tailless, being covered with straight greyish hair that "thickened about the head into a Skye terrier's mane", having human-like hands (described as fore feet), and having a roundish head with a projecting forehead and forward-looking eyes that were obscured by lank hair.

The Eloi are herded, bred and maintained by the Morlocks as a food source, much like cows or pigs are today.

Film adaptions

In the 1960 film version of the book, the Eloi are depicted as identical to modern humans but small, blond, and blue-eyed. The Morlocks use an air raid siren to put the Eloi into a trance state and lure them into their caves. One of the Eloi is motivated to beat a Morlock to death when it attacks the Time Traveller.

In the 2002 movie adaptation of The Time Machine, the Eloi are depicted as identical to modern humans with a hunter-gatherer lifestyle and sport primitive-style clothing and appear to be an ethnic amalgamation of various indigenous races but maintain the English language as an intellectual exercise.

In Dan Simmons' Ilium
In Dan Simmons'  Ilium novel, "Eloi" is a nickname for the lazy, uneducated, and uncultured descendants of the human race after the post-humans have left Earth. The name is a reference to Wells'  Eloi. Old-style humans and post-humans rule in Simmons' novel, with the Eloi being kept in "zoos" in restricted areas on Earth. The Eloi are technically adept but don't understand the technology; they regress and unlearn millennia of culture, thought and reason, until they are satisfied with the pleasure of merely existing.

Later use of the name
 The 1995 novel The Time Ships by Stephen Baxter is a (Wells' estate) authorised sequel of The Time Machine published to mark its centennial.
 The German progressive rock band Eloy, founded in 1969, are named after the race.
 The Elokoi of Brian Caswell's 1995 novel Deucalion are presumably inspired by the Eloi, but ones without the dark side of the Morlocks.
 Geoff Ryman's 2005 novel Air contains a fictional ethnic minority called the Eloi, whose struggle for autonomy is quashed by a repressive government.
 James Alan Gardner uses the terms "Eloi" and "Morlock" in his 1997 novel Expendable to refer to two warring sects of 'glass people'.
 The name is used as a term of derision in Feed (2002) by M.T. Anderson.
 In Greg Bear's 1993 novel Moving Mars, "Eloi" are humans who seek to extend their lifespans beyond 1,000 years, through the use of advanced medical nanotechnology and other enhancements.
 In John Brosnan's 1989–91 far-future post-disaster trilogy The Sky Lords, the Eloi is a term for a small group of "genetically-enhanced humans of indeterminate sex".
 Political commentator Mark Steyn in his 2011 book After America: Get Ready for Armageddon uses the Eloi as a metaphor for what he believes is a post-Western society collapsed under the weight of secular-socialist political correctness, self-loathing and entitlement.
 In his non-fiction essay In the Beginning... Was the Command Line (1999), Neal Stephenson uses Morlocks and Eloi as a metaphor for what he sees as a distinction in contemporary culture: "Eloi learn everything they know from being steeped from birth in electronic media directed and controlled by book-reading Morlocks."
 Eloi feature in Bookworm Adventures 2. An Eloi, under the modified name of Loyim, is an enemy in the sixth book, together with several Morlocks.

References

Fictional civilizations
Human-derived fictional species
The Time Machine
Literary characters introduced in 1895
Characters in written science fiction
Characters in British novels of the 19th century